The Carl Hanser Verlag was founded in 1928 by Carl Hanser in Munich and is one of the few medium-sized publishing companies in the German-speaking area still owned by the founding family.

History 
From the very beginning, the publishing house has been active in the two fields of fiction and literature, with fictional fiction being published from 1933 to 1946. The foundation stones of the publishing house were laid with the participation of the magazine "Betriebsstechnik", which was incorporated into the publishing house in 1933. The activities in the field of trade journals, with 21 publications, play an important role in addition to the literature and specialist books.

The founder, Carl Hanser, withdrew from the active publishing management in 1976. In 1985 Carl Hanser died. Wolfgang Beisler, a grandson of Carl Hanser, became a member of the management in 1996. Michael Krüger was Managing Director of Carl Hanser Verlag until 2013 when Jo Lendle took over.

In 1961, Carl Hanser Verlag was one of eleven founding members of the dtv Verlagsgesellschaft. Already in 1954, it was one of the founders of the book series Die Bücher der Neunzehn (The Books of the Nineteen). In 1993 the joint venture "Hanser Gardner Publications, Inc." was founded in Cincinnati / Ohio. In the same year, the publishing house extended its activities to include children's literature. In 1995, Hanser took over the "Fachbuchverlag Leipzig" and the "Sanssouci Verlag". Since 1999, the Hanser children's and youth books have been published under the name "Reihe Hanser" and also as paperback at dtv. In the area of audiobooks, Hanser Verlag co-founded the start-up of the "DHV - Der Hörverlag".

Current situation 
Today, the publisher is one of the few publishers in Germany that does not belong to a large corporation. At the Munich and Leipzig locations, approximately 200 employees are employed and generated sales amount to approximately €50 million. Its subsidiaries are the Paul Zsolnay Verlag in Wien, acquired in 1996, along with the Deuticke Verlag, acquired in 2004, the Nagel & Kimche Verlag in Zürich, acquired in 1999, as well as the Sanssouci Verlag and Hanser Publications, LLC in Cincinnati / USA. Participation also exists at DHV and dtv. Also included in the Hanser-Group since November 2010, is the "Henrich Publications" headquartered in Gilching near Munich,  and is a publishing house for technical journals with readers mainly in manufacturing industry, mechanical engineering, metalworking, as well as electrical trade, in-house logistics and the energy industry.

In 2011 the subsidiary "Hanser Berlin" was founded, which started with the autumn program in 2012. Managing director at the beginning was the editor Elisabeth Ruge. In 2013, she stepped away from the Hanser publishing house, and her management position at "Hanser Berlin", which Karsten Kredel took over.

According to the Cicero magazines publishing questionnaire, Hanser is currently the most important publisher of German-language literature with authors such as Herta Müller, Martin Mosebach, Reinhard Jirgl and David Grossman. In the area of children and youth books, Hanser has always been able to secure the rights of important authors. Among other authors who write at Hanser, are David Almond, John Green, Finn-Ole Heinrich, Janne Teller, Peter Pohl and Rafik Schami. The publisher's work was awarded the "Virenschleuder-Preis" at the Frankfurt Book Fair in 2012.

Hanser Fachbuch publishes trade and specialized books from the fields of computer, technology, economy and knowledge. With its computer books, the publisher covers the areas of programming, software development, IT and project management as well as online marketing. On HanserUpdate, the authors of the Computer books News and trades section are blogging about IT topics.

References

External links

 

Book publishing companies of Germany
Children's book publishers
Theatres in Munich
Academic publishing companies
Mass media in Munich
German companies established in 1928
Publishing companies established in 1928